The Unitary National Liberation Front (JNOF) or simply the National Liberation Front (sometimes referred to as the People's Liberation Front), was a World War II political organization and Anti-fascism movement during World War II in Yugoslavia. 

It was headed by the Communist Party of Yugoslavia (KPJ), and united all political parties and individuals of the republican, federalist, and left-wing political spectrum in the occupied Kingdom of Yugoslavia. 

The Front served as political backing to the Yugoslav Resistance movement, known as the Yugoslav Partisans. 

In 1945 with Partisans winning the war, the Unitary People's Liberation Front was reorganized and renamed the People's Front of Yugoslavia (Narodni Front, NOF). Under this name the Front won the post-war Yugoslav elections, after which it was soon renamed into Socialist Alliance of Working People of Yugoslavia (Socijalistički savez radnog naroda Jugoslavije, SSRNJ).

See also

Yugoslav Partisans
Anti-fascism in Yugoslavia
Eastern European World War II resistance movements
League of Communists of Yugoslavia
Popular fronts
Yugoslavia in World War II
Socialist Federal Republic of Yugoslavia
1941 establishments in Yugoslavia
1945 disestablishments in Yugoslavia